Akif Gürgen (born September 23, 1967) is a Turkish volleyball player. He is 193 cm and plays as libero. He plays for Galatasaray Yurtiçi Kargo

References

1977 births
Living people
Turkish men's volleyball players
Galatasaray S.K. (men's volleyball) players